Nova Lipa can refer to one of the following towns:

 Nova Lipa, Croatia
 Nova Lipa, Slovenia